Ian John Burgess (6 July 1930 – 19 May 2012) was a British racing driver, born in London. He participated in 20 Formula One World Championship Grands Prix, debuting on 19 July 1958, and numerous non-Championship Formula One races. He scored no championship points.

Racing career
Burgess began racing in 1950 with a Cooper Formula Three car and had a successful 1951 season including a win at the Nürburgring before moving up to sports cars and Formula Two, where he was less successful.

Burgess began working for Cooper, both in their factory and at their drivers' school based at Brands Hatch and raced one of the works Formula Two cars in 1957, when he achieved fourth place in the Oulton Park Gold Cup. This led to a drive with Tommy Atkins' team in 1958, with a similar machine. He won at Crystal Palace and Snetterton and gained fourth places at Reims and Montlhéry. However, a broken leg at AVUS ended his season but not before he made his Formula One debut for Cooper at the British Grand Prix.

Burgess returned in 1959 driving Scuderia Centro Sud's Cooper T51-Maserati with a best finish of sixth in the German Grand Prix. He continued with the team in 1960 with little success.

For 1961 he joined the American Camoradi International team, competing in five Grands Prix (three starts) with a best finish of 12th in the German Grand Prix. He moved to the Anglo American Equipe team in 1962 competing in three Grands Prix, finishing no higher than 11th. 1963 was his last year in racing and he competed in two Grands Prix for the Scirocco-Powell team, retiring from both.

Burgess died in Harrow, aged 81.

Complete Formula One World Championship results
(key)

References

Profile at grandprix.com
Hayhoe, David & Holland, David (2006). Grand Prix Data Book (4th edition). Haynes, Sparkford, UK.

External links
Ian Burgess profile at The 500 Owners Association

1930 births
2012 deaths
English racing drivers
English Formula One drivers
Cooper Formula One drivers
Scuderia Centro Sud Formula One drivers
Camoradi Formula One drivers
Scirocco-Powell Formula One drivers